Aglaia roxburghiana is a species of Aglaia. It is native to South Asia and Australia.

References 

roxburghiana
Flora of tropical Asia
Flora of Australia